A Tragedy at Midnight is a 1942 American comedy film directed by Joseph Santley and written by Isabel Dawn. The film stars John Howard, Margaret Lindsay, Roscoe Karns, Mona Barrie, Keye Luke and Hobart Cavanaugh. The film was released on February 2, 1942, by Republic Pictures.

Plot

Cast 
John Howard as Greg Sherman
Margaret Lindsay as Beth Sherman
Roscoe Karns as Det. Lt. Cassidy
Mona Barrie as Alta Wilton
Keye Luke as Ah Foo
Hobart Cavanaugh as Charles Miller
Paul Harvey as Landeck
Lilian Bond as Lola
Miles Mander as Dr. Hilary Wilton
William Newell as Swanson
Wendell Niles as Show Announcer
Archie Twitchell as Henry Carney

References

External links
 

1942 films
1940s English-language films
American comedy films
1942 comedy films
Republic Pictures films
Films directed by Joseph Santley
American black-and-white films
1940s American films